Peers Lee Carter (5 December 1916 – 8 February 2001) was a British diplomat. He was Ambassador to Afghanistan from 1968 to 1972.

References

Ambassadors of the United Kingdom to Afghanistan
1916 births
2001 deaths